Bob Sullivan was an Australian rugby league footballer who played in the 1940s and 1950s. He played in the NSWRFL premiership for North Sydney as a five-eighth.

Playing career
Sullivan began his first grade career in 1949 with North Sydney.  In the early 1950s, Sullivan was a member of the North Sydney sides which reached the preliminary finals but fell short of a grand final appearance.  In 1954, Sullivan was selected to play for Australia against Great Britain and in the same year was selected to play for New South Wales in the interstate series against Queensland.  Sullivan played with North Sydney up until the end of 1959 where he captained North Sydney to a reserve grade premiership, his last game in first grade was during the 1957 season.  Sullivan was the son of former North Sydney player Con Sullivan and the nephew of Sid Deane who is a member of the North Sydney Bears team of the century.

Post playing
Sullivan was later a long serving president of the North Sydney club and was inducted as a life member.  Sullivan also coached North Sydney between 1961 and 1962 with limited success.

References

1931 births
2009 deaths
Australia national rugby league team players
Australasia rugby league team players
New South Wales rugby league team players
North Sydney Bears coaches
North Sydney Bears players
Rugby league five-eighths
Rugby league players from Sydney